Luís Manuel Ferreira Delgado (born 1 November 1979 in Luanda), is a retired Angolan professional footballer who played mainly as a left defender.

Club career 
Delgado began his career with Petro Atletico and joined later to rivals Primeiro de Agosto the best two major football teams in Angolan Championship Girabola. After good performances in the 2006 FIFA World Cup, Delgado transferred to French club FC Metz. As result of the promotion of FC Metz to the French Ligue 1, Delgado became the first Angolan football player to play for a team in the top tier of the French football.

On June 5, 2009, the Angola international left-back signed a two-year contract with En Avant de Guingamp on a free transfer.

International career 
Delgado has represented Angola in 2 FIFA World Cup qualification matches and was called up to the 2006 World Cup.

National team statistics

References

External links 

1979 births
Living people
Footballers from Luanda
Association football defenders
Angolan footballers
Angola international footballers
2006 FIFA World Cup players
2006 Africa Cup of Nations players
2008 Africa Cup of Nations players
Atlético Petróleos de Luanda players
C.D. Primeiro de Agosto players
FC Metz players
En Avant Guingamp players
Ligue 1 players
Ligue 2 players
Expatriate footballers in France